Targeted mass spectrometry is a mass spectrometry technique that uses multiple stages of tandem mass spectrometry (MSn with n=2 or 3) for ions of specific mass (m/z), at specific time. The values of the m/z and time are defined in an inclusion list which is derived from a previous analysis.

Applications
Targeted analysis allows the thorough analysis of all ions, at all abundance range above the noise level, at any time window in the experiment. In contrast, non-targeted analysis would, typically, only allow detection of the most abundant 50-100 ions over the entire experiment time. Such limitation of non-targeted analysis makes it less suitable for analyzing highly complex, highly dynamic sample such as human blood serum.

However, the methods of utilizing targeted mass spectrometry are still at a primitive stage, in the sense that the inclusion list used in the targeted analysis is typically manually typed-in by scientists. In addition to that, only one inclusion list is allowed for the entire experiment. Such manual process is both labor-intensive and error-prone. This is largely due to the lack of software to control the mass spectrometer.

Automation
There have been some efforts in automating the generation of inclusion lists through the solution of external software. In 2010, Wu et al. introduced a semi-automatic method in an effort of identifying low-abundance glyco-peptide. They implemented the automation through iterative experiments and the open-source software GLYPID. With minor modification, this approach can used in analyzing any other simple or complex samples. In addition to the advantage mentioned before, this semi-automated approach also saves substantial amount of time and efforts for scientists in manually picking ions and re-calibrating instruments.

See also
Data-independent acquisition

References

Mass spectrometry